Xylophanes pluto, the Pluto sphinx, is a moth of the family Sphingidae. The species was first described by Johan Christian Fabricius in 1777.

Distribution 
It is native to the Americas, where it can be found from Argentina and Paraguay to Bolivia and then through tropical and subtropical lowlands from Brazil north through Central America to Mexico, the West Indies, southern Florida and southern Texas.

Description 
The wingspan is 53–65 mm. The prominent broad chrome-yellow band distinguishes this species from all other Xylophaness. The thorax is green. The abdomen has a thin medial line, interrupted at the base of each segment by a metallic yellow dot. The lateral lines are also present. The thorax and abdomen are maize yellow, with metallic yellow scales, a few of which are also found dorso-laterally.

Biology 
There are multiple generations per year in Florida and Texas. Adults are on wing year round in the tropics.

The larvae feed on Chiococca and Erythroxylum species, and Hamelia patens and Morinda royoc. There are three colour morphs, green, brown, and purplish brown. The false eyes are conspicuous in the last form. The larvae start feeding at the beginning of dusk and keep feeding throughout the night. During the day they hide at the base of their host plant or in nearby vegetation.

References

pluto
Moths described in 1777
Moths of South America